Diamond Miller (born February 11, 2001) is an American college basketball player for the Maryland Terrapins of the Big Ten Conference. She played basketball at Franklin High School in Somerset, New Jersey, where she was rated a five-star recruit by ESPN and earned McDonald's All-American honors in 2019. Miller is a two-time All-Big Ten selection at Maryland and was named most outstanding player (MOP) of the 2021 Big Ten tournament. She has won three gold medals representing the United States, including with the senior national team at the 2021 FIBA Women's AmeriCup.

Early life and high school career
Miller grew up playing basketball and soccer. In her childhood, she played basketball with her two older sisters, Adreana and LaNiya, who inspired her to pursue the sport. Miller looked up to Candace Parker, Stephen Curry and Kevin Durant. She was coached by her father, Lance, with Team Miller Lightning in the Amateur Athletic Union. Miller was a four-year varsity player at Franklin High School in Somerset, New Jersey. She averaged 15.5 points per game as a freshman. In her sophomore season, Miller averaged 18.1 points, 6.6 rebounds and 3.8 blocks per game, leading Franklin to a New Jersey Tournament of Champions and Group 4 state titles. 

As a junior, Miller averaged 23.8 points, 7.7 rebounds, 3.8 assists and 3.8 blocks per game, and was named Courier News Player of the Year for 2018. She broke her own program single-season scoring record and surpassed her sister, Adreana, as Franklin's all-time leading scorer. Miller led her team to the Group 4 state championship, scoring 27 points against Toms River High School North in the title game. In her senior season in 2018–19, she averaged 21.8 points, 8.7 rebounds and 3.1 blocks per game, repeating as Courier News Player of the Year. Miller led her team to a 34–0 record, another Tournament of Champions title, and the Group 4 state title. She was named New Jersey Gatorade Player of the Year, NJ.com Player of the Year, and USA Today New Jersey Player of the Year. She was selected to play in the McDonald's All-American Game.

Recruiting
Miller was considered a five-star recruit and the number 17 player in the 2019 class by ESPN. She received her first college basketball scholarship offer from Villanova, her father's alma mater, in eighth grade. On March 10, 2018, she committed to playing college basketball for Maryland over an offer from Notre Dame. Miller was drawn to the program by its coaching staff and proximity. On November 14, she signed her National Letter of Intent with Maryland.

College career

In her freshman season at Maryland, Miller was a key reserve for Maryland. On November 24, 2019, she scored a season-high 17 points in a 107–52 win against Quinnipiac. As a freshman, Miller averaged 7.7 points and 3.2 rebounds per game. Her team won the Big Ten tournament and were contenders for the NCAA tournament, which was canceled amid the COVID-19 pandemic. Miller assumed a leading role alongside Ashley Owusu in her sophomore season. On December 3, 2020, she scored a career-high 28 points, shooting 5-of-7 from three-point range, in a 112–78 win over Towson. Miller posted 15 points and six assists in a 104–84 win against Iowa to capture her second Big Ten tournament title. She was named tournament MOP. As a sophomore, Miller averaged 17.3 points, 5.8 rebounds and 2.9 assists, earning first-team All-Big Ten honors. She was limited to begin her junior season due to a lingering knee injury, and missed 10 of her first 12 games. On January 6, 2022, Miller scored a season-high 24 points in a 106–78 victory over Penn State. She scored 24 points, with nine rebounds, three assists and three steals, in an 89–65 win over Florida Gulf Coast at the second round of the 2022 NCAA tournament. As a junior, Miller averaged 13.1 points, 4.1 rebounds and 2.8 assists per game, making the All-Big Ten second team. Following the season, she underwent knee surgery and was sidelined for three to six months.

National team career
Miller represented the United States at the 2017 FIBA Under-16 Women's Americas Championship in Argentina. She averaged 6.4 points, 5.6 rebounds and two steals per game, helping her team win the gold medal. Miller recorded 10 points, four rebounds and two steals in a 91–46 win over Canada in the final. She was a late addition to the United States team for the 2019 FIBA Under-19 Women's Basketball World Cup in Thailand. Miller averaged two points and 1.3 rebounds per game en route to a gold medal. She made her debut for the United States senior national team at the 2021 FIBA Women's AmeriCup in Puerto Rico. Miller averaged 4.7 points, four rebounds and two assists per game for the gold medal-winning team.

Personal life
Miller is the daughter of Dreana and Lance Miller. Her father played professional basketball in Europe after a college career at Villanova. Miller's two sisters have played college basketball: Adreana at La Salle and Ohio State, and LaNiya at Stony Brook and Wagner. She majors in family science at the University of Maryland, College Park.

References

External links
Maryland Terrapins bio

2001 births
Living people
American women's basketball players
Basketball players from New Jersey
Shooting guards
People from Franklin Township, Somerset County, New Jersey
People from Montclair, New Jersey
Maryland Terrapins women's basketball players
Franklin High School (New Jersey) alumni
McDonald's High School All-Americans
Sportspeople from Somerset County, New Jersey
United States women's national basketball team players
All-American college women's basketball players